A New Day is the third full-length album from the post-hardcore band Four Letter Lie. It was released on October 13, 2009, through Victory with producer Matt Goldman. Timothy Java recorded all of the drum tracks on A New Day due to the departure of Derek Smith, the band's former drummer.

Compared to the band's previous material, this album has a more aggressive sound, although the band did not abandon their post-hardcore roots. With the exception of "My Surrender", none of the tracks show an instance of clean vocals.

Track listing

Personnel
 Brian Nagan – lead vocals
 Connor Kelly – lead guitar
 John Waltmann – rhythm guitar
 Louis Hammel – bass
 Tai Wright – drums, percussion

Additional musicians
 Jesse Barrera - clean vocals on track 5

References

2009 albums
Four Letter Lie albums